Milica Vukadinović (born 18 November 1968) is a Serbian former basketball player. She grew up in Belgrade, Yugoslavia, where she played for ŽKK Crvena zvezda and the Yugoslavian national team. She played college basketball for University of California, Berkeley where she was a two time First-team All-PAC-10 selection. Following her college stay, she played professionally in Germany for four seasons. She became the first Serbian player to play in the WNBA when she appeared in Charlotte Sting's opener of the 1997 WNBA season on 22 June where she scored 3 points in 14 minutes. That ended being her only WNBA game as a back injury that she suffered in the game ended her season. In 1999, she was set to join the Los Angeles Sparks but the deal fell through due to visa problems.

See also 
 List of Serbian WNBA players

References

1968 births
Living people
California Golden Bears women's basketball players
Charlotte Sting players
Serbian women's basketball players
ŽKK Crvena zvezda players